Api Ratuniyarawa (born 11 July 1986) is a professional rugby union player who currently players for English Premiership side London Irish. He was named in Fiji's squad for the 2015 Rugby World Cup.

In September 2016, he signed for Northampton Saints joining another Fijian player, Campese Ma'afu at the club.

Since joining Saints, the lock featured in three games for the club before being called away to Fiji for the Autumn Internationals, earning his 20th cap for his country against his Northampton Saints teammates Dylan Hartley, Courtney Lawes and Teimana Harrison at Twickenham on Saturday 19 November 2016.

Now having racked up 31 appearances for the club, Ratuniyarawa was most recently involved in the side's campaign to secure European Champions Cup rugby for the 2017/18 season. The side beat Stade Francais in the European Champions Cup play-off final by one point to seal the last spot in the following season's competition, Ratuniyarawa coming off the bench to make an impact in that fixture.

The forward was also selected for Fiji's upcoming international summer series for 2017 alongside fellow Northampton Saint, Campese Ma'afu.

References

External links 
 

1986 births
Living people
Fijian rugby union players
Fiji international rugby union players
People from Sigatoka
Fijian expatriate sportspeople in France
Fijian expatriate sportspeople in England
Expatriate rugby union players in France
Expatriate rugby union players in England
Fijian expatriate rugby union players
SU Agen Lot-et-Garonne players
Northampton Saints players
Rugby union locks
Fijian expatriate sportspeople in New Zealand
Expatriate rugby union players in New Zealand